Thomas Arthur Steitz (August 23, 1940 – October 9, 2018) was an American biochemist,  a Sterling Professor of Molecular Biophysics and Biochemistry at Yale University, and investigator at the Howard Hughes Medical Institute, best known for his pioneering work on the ribosome.

Steitz was awarded the 2009 Nobel Prize in Chemistry along with Venkatraman Ramakrishnan and Ada Yonath "for studies of the structure and function of the ribosome".  Steitz also won the Gairdner International Award in 2007 "for his studies on the structure and function of the ribosome which showed that the peptidyl transferase (EC 2.3.2.12) was an RNA catalyzed reaction, and for revealing the mechanism of inhibition of this function by antibiotics".

Education and career
Born in Milwaukee, Wisconsin, Steitz studied chemistry as an undergraduate at Lawrence University in Appleton, Wisconsin, graduating in 1962.  In June 2010, the University renamed its chemistry building Thomas A. Steitz Hall of Science.

He received a Ph.D. in biochemistry and molecular biology from Harvard University in 1966 where he worked under the direction of subsequent 1976 chemistry Nobel Prize winner William N. Lipscomb, Jr.
While at Harvard, after the training task of determining the structure of the small molecule methyl ethylene phosphate, Steitz made contributions to determining the atomic structures of carboxypeptidase A (EC 3.4.17.1) and aspartate carbamoyltransferase (EC 2.1.3.2), each the largest atomic structure determined in its time.

Steitz did postdoctoral research as a Jane Coffin Childs Postdoctoral Fellow at the MRC Laboratory of Molecular Biology at the University of Cambridge during 1967–1970.

Steitz briefly held an assistant professorship at the University of California, Berkeley, but he resigned on the grounds that the institution would not accept his wife Joan into a faculty position because she was a woman.

Both Tom and Joan Steitz instead joined the Yale faculty in 1970, where he continued to work on cellular and structural biology. Steitz and Peter Moore determined the atomic structure of the large 50S ribosomal subunit using X-ray crystallography, and published their findings in Science in 2000. In 2009, Steitz was awarded the Nobel Prize in Chemistry for his ribosome research.

He was also a Macy Fellow at the University of Göttingen during 1976–1977 and a Fairchild Scholar at the California Institute of Technology during 1984-1985.

Steitz was also one of the founders of a company, Rib-X Pharmaceuticals, now Melinta Therapeutics for the development of new antibiotics based on the ribosome.

Honors
 Nobel Prize in Chemistry (2009)
 Elected a Foreign Member of the Royal Society (ForMemRS) in 2011

Private life
He enjoyed skiing, hiking, and gardening.

 
 
Steitz was married to Joan A. Steitz, a distinguished molecular biologist who is also a Sterling Professor of Molecular Biophysics and Biochemistry at Yale. He lived with her in Branford, Connecticut and had one son, Jon, and two grandchildren, Adam and Maddy. He died on October 9, 2018 of complications during treatment of pancreatic cancer.

Publications
 Steitz, T. A., et al. "Determination of the Atomic-Resolution Crystal Structure of the Large Subunit from the Ribosome of Haloarcula marismortui;", nsls newsletter, (November 2000).
 Steitz, T. A., et al. "The Atomic Resolution Crystal Structure of the Large Ribosomal Subunit from Haloarcula marismortui", NSLS Activity Report (2000).

See also
 History of RNA biology
 List of RNA biologists

References

External links

 "Inquisitiveness of Milwaukee native leads to a Nobel Prize", The Milwaukee Journal Sentinel.
 Thomas Steitz - MIPtalk.com interview
 Lawrence University Graduate Awarded Nobel Prize in Chemistry
 

1940 births
2018 deaths
American biochemists
American biophysicists
American Nobel laureates
American crystallographers
Harvard University alumni
Howard Hughes Medical Investigators
Lawrence University alumni
American people of German descent
Members of the United States National Academy of Sciences
Nobel laureates in Chemistry
Scientists from Milwaukee
Yale Sterling Professors
Yale Department of Molecular Biophysics & Biochemistry faculty
Yale University faculty
Foreign Members of the Royal Society
People from Branford, Connecticut
Deaths from cancer in Connecticut
Deaths from pancreatic cancer